Geocoris bullatus, the large big-eyed bug, is a species of big-eyed bug in the family Geocoridae. It is found in North America.

Subspecies
These three subspecies belong to the species Geocoris bullatus:
 Geocoris bullatus borealis (Dallas, 1852)
 Geocoris bullatus bullatus (Say, 1831)
 Geocoris bullatus obscuratus Montandon, 1908

References

Lygaeoidea
Hemiptera of North America
Insects described in 1832
Taxa named by Thomas Say
Articles created by Qbugbot